Darvin is a masculine given name. Notable people with the name include:

 Darvin Adams (born 1990), American-born Canadian football player
 Dárvin Chávez (born 1989), Mexican footballer
 Darvin Ebanks (born 1993), American soccer player
 Darvin Edwards (born 1986), Saint Lucian athlete
 Darvin Ham (born 1973), American basketball player and coach
 Darvin Kidsy (born 1995), American football player
 Darvin Moon (1963–2020), American logger and poker player
 Darvin Watson (born 1992), Caymanian footballer

See also
 Darwin (given name)

Masculine given names